The Xe Bang Fai River (Nam Xebangfai) is a river in Laos. It flows through Khammouane Province and Savannakhet Province.

Xe Bang Fai River Cave 
Xe Bang Fai River Cave is in Hin Namno National Park in Khammouane Province. It is believed to be one of the largest river caves in the world with passages some 120 meters tall and 200 meters wide, and a subterranean channel seven kilometres long.

Notes

References

External links
 Account of a visit to the Xe Bang Fai cave in 2014 
 Account of a second visit to the Xe Bang Fai cave, Tham Khoun Xe in 2015

Rivers of Laos
Geography of Savannakhet province
Geography of Khammouane province